Athanasios 'Thanasis' Mangos (Greek: Αθανάσιος 'Θανάσης' Μάγγος; born 16 May 1990) is a Greek professional footballer, who last played for AEL 1964 FC in the Greek Football League.

External links 
AEL 1964 FC Official
Player Announcement
Profile
End of contract AEL 1964

1990 births
Living people
Greek footballers
Athlitiki Enosi Larissa F.C. players
Association football midfielders
Footballers from Larissa